The 1999–2000 season was the 91st year of football played by Dundee United, and covers the period from 1 July 1999 to 30 June 2000. United finished in eighth place, an improvement on last year's ninth-place finish, despite accumulating fewer points in this campaign.

United were knocked out of both domestic cup competitions by Aberdeen – in the League Cup semi-finals and the Scottish Cup quarter-finals, both by a score of 1–0.

Review and events

United sold top scorer Billy Dodds to Rangers at the start of December and immediately the club's fortunes changed. Sitting third in the league, the club would win only one of the next fourteen league games and three in total for the rest of the season. In fact, United lost 11 of the last 13 matches, consigning them to eighth place. Such was Dodds' impact that he finished top scorer, despite only playing the first four months of the season with the club.

Match results
Dundee United played a total of 44 competitive matches during the 1999–2000 season. The team finished eighth in the Scottish Premier League.

In the cup competitions, United were knocked out of the Scottish Cup at the quarter-finals stage, losing 1–0 to Aberdeen. The same team knocked United out of the CIS Insurance Cup, this time at the semi-final stage. Both matches finished 1–0.

Legend

All results are written with Dundee United's score first.

Bank of Scotland Premierleague

Tennent's Scottish Cup

CIS Insurance Cup

Player details
During the 1999–00 season, United used 29 different players, with a further three named as substitutes who did not make an appearance on the pitch. The table below shows the number of appearances and goals scored by each player.

|}

Goalscorers
Thirteen players scored for the United first team with the team scoring 52 goals in total. Despite leaving the club in early December and playing only eighteen matches, Billy Dodds was the top goalscorer, scoring ten goals.

Discipline
During the 1999–2000 season, eight United players were sent off, and twenty players received at least one yellow card. In total, the team received eight dismissals and 70 cautions.

Team statistics

League table

Transfers

In
Nine players were signed during the 1999–2000 season, with a total (public) transfer cost of around £750,000.

The players that joined Dundee United during the 1999–00 season, along with their previous club, are listed below.

Out
Seven players left the club during the season with only one transfer – Billy Dodds to Rangers – bringing in a fee (£1.3m). The club made a transfer profit of around £500k for the season.

Listed below are the players that were released during the season, along with the club that they joined. Players did not necessarily join their next club immediately.

Playing kit

The jerseys were sponsored for the fourth consecutive season by Telewest.

Trivia
Joaquim Ferraz's six league goals came in consecutive games – three times. He found the net in the first two matches of the season, had a fourteen-game gap until two in his next two games before taking six matches to fire his next two goals. He only finished on the losing side once after scoring in the league.

References

External links
Soccerbase
Results
Squad stats
Transfers

Dundee United F.C. seasons
Dundee United